At the 1900 Summer Olympics, five equestrian events were contested. The competition was held from 29 May to 2 June at the Place de Breteuil in the 7th arrondissement of Paris, as part of the Exposition Universelle in Paris. The equestrian events were organised by the Société Hippique Française and titled as the Concours Hippique International (English: International Horse Show), with competitors from eight countries competing in three jumping and two driving events.

Only the three jumping events had been considered "Olympic" by the International Olympic Committee in the past. The IOC website currently has affirmed a total of 95 medal events, after accepting, as it appears, the recommendation of Olympic historian Bill Mallon for events that should be considered "Olympic". These additional events include two equestrian driving events. It is not certain how many competitors there were, but it is likely that there were between 37 and 64. Five nations competed in the Olympic jumping events, with three more (Germany, Spain, and Austria) in the two driving events. There were two female riders, both of whom competed in the hacks and hunter combined event: Italian Elvira Guerra and Frenchwoman Jane Moulin.

Schedule

Medal table

Medal summary

See also
List of Olympic medalists in equestrian

Notes

References

Sources

 International Olympic Committee medal winners database
 De Wael, Herman. Herman's Full Olympians: "Equestrian 1900". Accessed 19 January 2006.
 

 
1900 Summer Olympics events
1900s